Martina Hermina Antonia (Tineke) Strik (born 28 September 1961 in Alphen, Gelderland) is a Dutch politician. From 2007 to 2019 she was a member of the Senate for GreenLeft. Since 2019 she is a member of the European Parliament for the Greens.

Biography
Between 1979 and 1983, Strik studied social-cultural work at the social academy "Den Elzent" in Eindhoven. In the meanwhile, she worked at the Kindertelefoon, a phone help line for children. Between 1981 and 1985, she worked as a youth worker at the Cultural Youth Centre "De Effelaar" in Eindhoven. She continued to study international law at the Radboud University between 1985 and 1991, she also studied Turkish between 1989 and 1991. Between 1990 and 1993, she worked a legal consultant at the Youth Advice Centre in Amsterdam. Between 1994 and 1995, she briefly studied law at the Radbouw University. She also took courses at the Red Cross, Clingendael, and the University Utrecht where she studied war law, European law and administrative law. Between 1993 and 1996, she worked at Vluchtelingenwerk, an organization that helps refugees, as a legal consultant. She then worked as a judicial secretary at the court of Zwolle, working for the chamber of refugees. In 1997, she made the switch to politics: she began to work for the GreenLeft parliamentary party as a policy advisor on justice. Between 2001 and 2002, she worked as policy coordinator for the Ministry of Justice.

Between 2002 and 2006, she was alderman for social affairs, including youth, culture and minorities in Wageningen. In 2004, she also became researcher-PhD-candidate at the Centre for Migration law of the Radboud University. She had several positions within the GreenLeft. She was member of the Strategic Council, a council of local and national GreenLeft politicians on the party's course. In 2005–2006, she was a member of the committee which wrote GreenLeft's election program. She also was suppleant of the congress of local government of the Council of Europe and observer at the 2005 local elections in the Palestinian National Authority.

In 2007, she was elected into the Senate.  In 2008, she announced that she was one of five candidates for the position of top candidate for the GreenLeft in the 2009 European Parliament election.

References

1961 births
Living people
Dutch republicans
Dutch social workers
Dutch women in politics
GroenLinks politicians
Members of the Senate (Netherlands)
People from West Maas en Waal
Radboud University Nijmegen alumni
MEPs for the Netherlands 2019–2024